Arthur Campbell (November 3, 1743 – August 8, 1811) was a soldier in the Indian Wars and the American Revolutionary War as well as a member of the Virginia House of Delegates. Campbell County, Tennessee, was named after him.

Family
He was a brother-in-law of General William Campbell. Two of his sons died in the War of 1812: Colonel James Campbell died in the service at Mobile, Alabama; and Colonel John B. Campbell fell at the Battle of Chippewa, where he commanded the right wing of the army under General Winfield Scott.

Early life and capture
Campbell was born in Augusta County, Virginia in 1743. When just fifteen years old, he volunteered as a militiaman, to perform duty in protecting the colonial frontier from incursions by the Indians. He was stationed at a fort near where the road leading from Staunton to the Warm Springs crossed the Cowpasture River.

While engaged in this service, he was captured by the Indians, who loaded him with their packs, and marched him seven days into the forest.  His captors were from the area of Lakes Erie and Michigan, and were on their return from hunting. Campbell, at the end of the journey, was so exhausted that he was unable to travel, and was treated by the Indians with great severity. An old chief, taking compassion on him, protected him from further injury, and on reaching the Lakes adopted Campbell, in whose family the young man remained during his three years' captivity.

During this time, Campbell made himself familiar with his captors' language, manners and customs. He soon acquired the confidence of the old chief, who took him on all his hunting excursions. During these trips they rambled over present-day Michigan and the northern parts of Ohio, Indiana, and Illinois.

In 1759 (during the French and Indian War), a British force marched towards the Upper Lakes, of which the Indians were informed by their scouts. Campbell conceived the bold resolution of escaping to this force. While out on one of their hunting excursions, Campbell left the Indians, and after a fortnight's tramp through the pathless wilds reached the British. The British commander was much interested in Campbell's account of his captivity and escape, and with his intelligence, and engaged him to pilot the army, which he did with success. Shortly afterward he returned to Augusta County, Virginia, after an absence of more than three years. At the same time Campbell, along with Joseph Martin, began acting as an agent to the Indians, reporting back to Virginia governors Benjamin Harrison V, Edmund Randolph and others on the state of Indian-colonial relations.

In 1772, his father, David Campbell, and family, removed to the "Royal Oak," on Holston River. In 1775 he was one of the 13 signers of the Fincastle Resolutions, the earliest statement of armed resistance to the British Crown in the American Colonies. In 1776, Arthur Campbell was appointed major in the Fincastle militia and elected to the General Assembly. He was also a member of the convention for forming the State Constitution. When Washington County, Virginia, was formed he was commissioned colonel commandant of a regiment for more than 30 years, and during that time he commanded several expeditions, particularly that against the Cherokees, in December 1780 and January 1781, with whom he made an important treaty.

After 35 years' residence at Holston, he removed to Yellow Creek, Knox County, Kentucky, the present site of Middlesboro, Kentucky.

He was tall, of a dignified air, an extensive reader and good talker. He married his cousin, Margaret Campbell, a sister of Gen. General William Campbell. He died from the effects of a cancer in Yellow Creek, leaving a widow, six sons and six daughters to mourn his loss.

When Middlesboro first attracted the attention of the business people of this country, and great developments were in progress at that point, the grave of Colonel Campbell was discovered in an out-of-the-way place, and his remains were removed by his Tennessee relatives, and the grave newly marked.

References

 Peyton, John Lewis, History of Augusta County, Virginia, Samuel M. Yost & son, 1882.
 Summers, Lewis Preston,History of southwest Virginia, 1746-1786: Washington County, 1777-1870, J.L. Hill Print. Co., 1903.
 Drake, Francis Samuel,Dictionary of American biography, including men of the time: containing nearly ten thousand notices of persons of both sexes, of native and foreign birth, who have been remarkable, or prominently connected with the arts, sciences, literature, politics, or history, of the American continent, J.R. Osgood and company, 1876.
 Ripley, George and Dana, Charles Anderson, The New American cyclopaedia: a popular dictionary of general knowledge, Volume 4, Appleton, 1859.

External links
 Colonel Arthur Campbell

Members of the Virginia House of Delegates
Signers of the Fincastle Resolutions
Virginia militiamen in the American Revolution
1743 births
1811 deaths
Virginia colonial people
People of Virginia in the French and Indian War